The Chuí, or Chuy, Stream (Portuguese: Arroio Chuí , Rioplatense Spanish: Arroyo Chuy  or ), is a short stream on the Brazilian–Uruguayan border that is celebrated as Brazil's southernmost point.

Geography
The Chui rises in a small swamp in the sandy coastal plains of the far southern Brazilian state of Rio Grande do Sul. It runs initially southward, then turns east before flowing into the Atlantic Ocean. In its final course, the stream marks the last stretch of the Brazilian border with Uruguay. In Brazil, it lies mostly in the municipality of Santa Vitória do Palmar, with a short section in Chuí. The Uruguayan side belongs to the city of Chuy, in the department of Rocha.

The Chuí spans only a few tens of kilometres long and its water volume is relatively weak. This is why it is called an arroio or arroyo, which in Portuguese and Spanish means "stream", respectively. It would be unremarkable, were it not for the fact that it is known throughout Brazil and mentioned in all Brazilian geography schoolbooks as being the country's southernmost point.

The mouth of the Chuí Stream is not only the southernmost, but also the westernmost point of the Brazilian coast, as well as both the northernmost and easternmost point of the Uruguayan coast.

In popular culture
The widespread Brazilian Portuguese expression "do Oiapoque ao Chuí" ("from the Oiapoque to the Chuí [rivers]") is used to mean the whole nation, by mentioning the waterways that mark respectively the northern and southern extremities of the Brazilian coastline (the mouth of the Oiapoque River is often mistakenly thought to be the entire country's northernmost point, not only of its coast). The saying is used in the same way as Americans use the expression "from coast to coast."

Gallery

See also
Extreme points of Brazil
Chuí - nearby Brazilian city
Chuy - nearby Uruguayan city
Santa Vitória do Palmar - Brazilian municipality in whose territory most of the Chuí stream lies

References

External links

Barra del Chuy (in Spanish) - site of the neighbouring Uruguayan beach resort village, with many photographs of the mouth of the Chuí and neighbouring beaches and villages on both the Brazilian and Uruguayan sides.

Rivers of Rio Grande do Sul
Rivers of Uruguay
Brazil–Uruguay border
Extreme points of Brazil
Rivers of Rocha Department